is located on the north coast of Ishigaki Island, Okinawa Prefecture, Japan. Renowned for its white sands, turquoise waters and dense vegetation, the bay forms part of the Iriomote-Ishigaki National Park. Alongside Mount Omoto it has been designated a Place of Scenic Beauty. Black pearls are cultured in the bay.

Kabira Village is located near the bay. Its traditional culture was studied by American anthropologists in 1950-52.

See also

 Takuji Iwasaki

References

Places of Scenic Beauty
Bays of Japan
Tourist attractions in Okinawa Prefecture